Nashla Aguilar Abraham (born March 22, 1994) is a Mexican actress. She started her career in Código F.A.M.A.. She has appeared in: Noticieros con Carlos Loret de Mola, in different commercials, Al medio día, HOY, Nuestra Casa, Sueños y caramelos and the Mexican soap opera Atrévete a soñar; where she played a character named Paola. She lives in Mexico City.

Filmography

Awards

References 

Living people
1994 births